{{DISPLAYTITLE:C42H66O14}}
The molecular formula C42H66O14 (molar mass: 794.96 g/mol, exact mass: 794.4453 u) may refer to:

 Medigoxin
 Neokuguaglucoside

Molecular formulas